The Dizoid or Maji (Majoid) languages consist of three languages spoken in southwestern Ethiopia:
Dizi
Sheko
Nayi (Na'o)

Dizi differs from the rest of the two languages somewhat more (Aklilu 2003), although Glottolog considers similarities between Sheko and Nayi to be due to retentions rather than evidence of subgrouping.

Güldemann (2018) accepts that Dizoid is more likely to be related to Ta-Ne ("North Omotic") than Mao and Aroid are, and observes loanword influence on Maji languages from the Gimira subgroup of Ta-Ne.

Numerals
Comparison of numerals in individual languages:

See also
List of Proto-Maji reconstructions (Wiktionary)

References

 
Languages of Ethiopia
Language families
Omotic languages